Jackin may refer to:

Jacking, a type of dance
Jacking off, masturbation